René Meléndez may refer to:
 René Meléndez (footballer, born 1928)
 René Meléndez (footballer, born 1998)